is a passenger railway station in the city of Funabashi, Chiba Prefecture, Japan, operated by the private railway operator Keisei Electric Railway.

Lines
Keisei Funabashi Station is served by the Keisei Main Line, and is located 25.1 km from the Tokyo terminus at Keisei Ueno Station. Passengers can also transfer to the JR Sobu Line and Tobu Urban Park Line via a pedestrian passage.

Station layout
The station consists of two elevated opposed side platforms serving two platforms. The platforms are connected via an underpass to the station building.

Platforms

History
The station opened on 30 December 1916, initially named simply . This was renamed Keisei Funabashi from 18 November 1931. The station was elevated from November 2006. From 2006, the station became a stop on the Skyliner limited express train service. When the Skyliner moved to the Narita Sky Access Line in July 2010, Keisei Funabashi became a stop on the replacement Cityliner service between Ueno and Narita Airport (later truncated to Keisei-Narita).
Since the timetable revision on 5 December 2015, the station has become a stop on the Morningliner and Eveningliner train services.

Station numbering was introduced to all Keisei Line stations on 17 July 2010. Keisei Funabashi was assigned station number KS22.

Passenger statistics
In fiscal 2019, the station was used by an average of 20,709 passengers daily.

Surrounding area
 Funabashi Station (JR Sōbu Main Line and  Tobu Urban Park Line)
 Funabashi FACE

See also
 List of railway stations in Japan

References

External links

 

Railway stations in Chiba Prefecture
Keisei Main Line
Railway stations in Japan opened in 1916
Funabashi